Chang Dsu Yao  (14 June 1918 – 7 February 1992) was a teacher of the martial arts Meihuaquan and T'ai chi ch'uan.  He was also known as Chang Ch'êng Hsün (Wade-Giles).

Biography 
Chang Dsu Yao was born in Chai Chi Ts'ün Village, in the administrative area of Chu Chai Hsiang, district of Peixian (Pei-hsien) on June 14, 1918.  He died in Taipei, Taiwan, on February 7, 1992.  He was the sixteenth generation lineage holder of Mei Hwa Ch'üan (Meihuaquan).

He began to study Mei Hwa Ch'üan when he was six years old, and later trained under Liou Pao-chün.

In 1938, he came to Kwei-lin to study at the Military School for Officers, a branch of Wampoa Military Academy created in that Year, named "Military Sixth Campus").  Here, Chang met some important teachers, such as Chang Tung Shêng, and studied different styles of Martial Arts, such as Pa Chi Ch'üan, Pa Kwa Chang, Hsing I Ch'üan, Fu Style Pa Kwa Chang. After graduation, he fought in the anti-Japanese War first and then in the Chinese Civil War with the faction of Chiang Kai-shek against the Communists.

After the defeat of Chiang Kai-shek, Chang Dsu Yao took refuge in Taiwan.  In Taiwan he established contact with several famous Martial Artists such as Chêng Man-ch'ing(Chinese:鄭曼青), Liou Yün-ch'iao(Chinese:劉雲樵), Wu Ti-pang(Chinese:吳體胖), Chang Wu-chên(Chinese:張武臣).  He also taught Martial Arts to the Army and Police.  Chang wrote articles for “Wutan Tsa Chih”, a magazine founded by Liou Yun-ch'iao.

In 1974, Chang Dsu Yao retired from the Army and in 1975, he moved to Bologna, and then, in 1977, to Milan.  He had many students, including his sons Chang Wei-hsin and Chang Yu-hsin, and others, such as Hsü Wên-li, Maurizio Zanetti, Enrico Lazzerini, and Roberto Fassi, with whom he wrote several books on Martial Arts.

Chang School
In Italy, people referred to Chang Dsu Yao teachings as “the School of Chang” or “Chang Kungfu”. This school is divided in two sections: Wai Chia and Neijia.

Wai Chia
From Nankin Central Guoshu Institute:
Kung Li Ch'üan 功力拳.
From Mei Hwa Ch'üan 梅花拳:
a style named Lien Pu Ch'üan 練歩拳, which is a simplified version of Meihuaquan, created in Italy and that takes the name of the famous set in Central Guoshu Institute;
a set named "5 Shaolin" ("Mei Hwa Ch'üan Lao Chia" 梅花拳老架, known in Taiwan as Mei Hwa Ch'üan I-lu Chia)(梅花一路架);
"Ti Kung Ch'üan" 地功拳 o "Ti T'ang Ch'üan" 地膛拳;
other Mei Hwa Ch'üan sets (erlujia 二路架, sanlujia 三路架, ecc.);
pair exercise named "Po Chi" 搏擊 in Italy, and in Cina and in Taiwan named Tuei Ta 對打.
From Hung Ch'üan 洪拳:
"Hsiao Hung Ch'üan" 小洪拳;
"Ta Hung Ch'üan" 大洪拳.
From Ch'i Hsing T'ang Lang Ch'üan 七星螳螂拳:
the set "Pêng Pü Ch'üan" 崩歩拳.
From Pa Chi Ch'üan 八極拳: "Tan Ta Shang Chia" 單打上架
a set from Yüeh Chia Ch'üan 岳家拳
a set from Tsui Pa Hsien Ch'üan 醉八仙拳

 Neijia
 T'ai chi ch'uan 楊式太極拳:
 Yang-style t'ai chi ch'uan 108 postures form;
 Tuishou 推手;
 Sanshou閃手;
 Ch'in Na擒拿;
 Ta Lu 大捋;
 San Shou 散手.
 Hsing I Ch'üan 形意拳
 Wu Hsing Ch'üan 五行拳.
 Fu Style Pa Kwa Chang (Fu Chen Sung style):
 Lung Hsing Pa Kwa Chang 龍形八卦掌;
 Liang style I Ch'üan 兩儀拳;
 Ssu Hsiang Ch'üan 四象拳.

Ch'i Kung
In Chang Dsu Yao School there are three exercise named Baduanjin (or Pa Tüan Chin) 八段錦. The first set has traditional Pa Tüan Chin movements, the other two are made of modern Stretching exercises.

Weapons
After the graduation in Black Belt there are the study of many weapons and pair exercises with weapons. Also Weapons teaching is divided into Wai Chia and Neijia.
 For Wai Chia, this directory came from the book "Enciclopedia del Kungfu Shaolin":
Pang 棒;
Kun 棍;
Tan Tao 單刀;
Kwai 枴;
Shuang Chieh Kun 雙節棍;
Kwan Tao 關刀;
ch'iang 槍.

Duilian Bingxie (weapons in pair exercises):
Pang tuei Pang 棒對棒;
Kun tuei Kun 棍對棍;
Tan Tao tuei Pang 單刀對棒;
Tan Tao tuei Kun 單刀對棍;
Pang tuei Kun 棒對棍;
Kwai tuei Kun 枴對棍;
Shuang Chieh Kun dui Pang 雙節棍對棒;
Gun tuei Shuang Chieh Kun 棍對雙節棍;
Kwai tuei Tan Tao 枴對單刀.

For Neijia, weapons came from Yang-style t'ai chi ch'uan:
T'ai Chi Tao 太極刀;
T'ai Chi Kun 太極棍;
T'ai Chi Ch'iang 太極槍;
T'ai Chi T'ieh Ch'ih 太極鐵尺;
T'ai Chi Chien 太極劍.

Duilian Bingxie (weapons in pair exercises):
T'ai Chi Tao tuei T'ai Chi Tao 太極刀對太極刀;
T'ai Chi Kun tuei T'ai Chi Kun 太極棍對太極棍;
T'ai Chi Tao tuei T'ai Chi Kun 太極刀對太極棍;
T'ai Chi Tao tuei T'ai Chi Ch'iang  太極刀對太極槍;
T'ai Chi Kun tuei T'ai Chi Ch'iang  太極棍對太極槍;
T'ai Chi Ch'iang  tuei T'ai Chi Ch'iang  太極槍對太極槍;
T'ai Chi Chien tuei T'ai Chi Chien 太極劍對太極劍;
T'ai Chi T'ieh  Ch'ih tuei T'ai Chi Kun  太極鐵尺對太極棍;
T'ai Chi T'ieh  Ch'ih tuei T'ai Chi Ch'iang 太極鐵尺對太極槍.

Bibliography

References

External links
 FE.I.K. Federazione Italiana Kung-fu scuola ufficiale del M. Chang Dsu Yao (in Italian)
 Kung fu tradizionale cinese scuola Chang (in Italian)
 Kung Fu Scuola del Maestro Chang (in Italian)
 Federazione Kung Fu Tradizionale Libertas (in Italian)
 Centro Ricerche Tai Chi Italia (in Italian)
 Genealogia Chang Dsu Yao (in Italian)
 Genealogia Chang Dsu Yao (in Italian)
 Biografia Maurizio Zanetti (in Italian)

Videos
dimostrazione del Maestro Chang Dsu Yao

1918 births
1992 deaths
Chinese tai chi practitioners
Taiwanese martial artists
Sportspeople from Xuzhou
Chinese Civil War refugees
Taiwanese people from Jiangsu